Antelope Creek is a stream in the U.S. state of South Dakota.

Antelope Creek was named for the antelope, a native species in South Dakota.

See also
List of rivers of South Dakota

References

Rivers of Todd County, South Dakota
Rivers of South Dakota